This is a list of notable casino hotels. A casino hotel is an establishment consisting of a casino with temporary lodging provided in an on-premises hotel.

Casino hotels

 Agua Caliente Casino and Hotel
 Aladdin (defunct)
 Al Waddan Hotel
 Aliante Casino and Hotel
 Aquarius Casino Resort
 L'Arc Casino
 Aria Resort and Casino
 Arizona Charlie's Boulder
 Arizona Charlie's Decatur
 The Atlantic Club Casino Hotel (defunct)
 Atlantis Casino Resort Spa
 Atlantis Paradise Island
 L'Auberge Baton Rouge
 Baha Mar Casino & Hotel
 Bally's Atlantic City
 Bally's Casino Tunica (hotel demolished, now operating as 1st Jackpot Casino Tunica)
 Bear Claw Casino & Hotel
 Beau Rivage (Mississippi)
 Bellagio
 Belle of Baton Rouge
 Blue Chip Casino, Hotel and Spa
 Boardwalk Hotel and Casino (defunct)
 Boomtown New Orleans
 Boomtown Reno
 The Borgata
 Boulder Station
 Bourbon Street Hotel and Casino (defunct)
 Bullock Hotel
 Buffalo Bill's
 Cache Creek Casino Resort
 Cactus Pete's
 Caesars Atlantic City
 Caesars Palace
 Caesars Windsor
 California Hotel and Casino
 Camelot Hotel/Casino
 Cannery Casino and Hotel
 Carson Nugget
 Carson Station
 CasaBlanca Resort
 Casino Lisboa, Macau
 Casino Magic Biloxi
 Casino New Brunswick
 Casino Rama
 Casino Royale Hotel & Casino
 Castaways (defunct)
 Castaways Hotel and Casino (defunct)
 Chinook Winds Casino
 Choctaw Casino Resort
 Circus Circus Las Vegas
 Circus Circus Reno
 City of Dreams
 Claridge Atlantic City (presently just a stand-alone hotel)
 Clarion Hotel and Casino
 Club Cal Neva
 Colorado Belle (closed)
 The Cosmopolitan of Las Vegas
 The Cromwell Las Vegas
 The D Las Vegas
 Delta Downs
 Desert Inn (defunct)
 Dover Downs Hotel & Casino
 Downtown Grand
 Dunes (defunct)
 Dunes Hotel and Casino (Atlantic City) (never completed)
 Eastside Cannery
 Edgewater Hotel and Casino
 El Cortez
 El Rancho Hotel and Casino (defunct)
 El Rancho Vegas (defunct)
 Eldorado Reno
 Emerald Resort & Casino
 Encore Boston Harbor 
 Encore Las Vegas
 Excalibur Hotel and Casino
 Fiesta Henderson (defunct)
 Fiesta Rancho (defunct)
 FireKeepers Casino
 Fitzgeralds Casino and Hotel (defunct)
 Flamingo Las Vegas
 Four Queens
 Four Winds New Buffalo
 Foxwoods Resort Casino
 Fremont Hotel and Casino
 Galaxy Macau
 Gold Coast Hotel and Casino
 Gold Dust West Hotel and Casino
 Gold Spike Hotel and Casino
 Golden Gate Hotel and Casino
 Golden Nugget Atlantic City
 Golden Nugget Las Vegas
 Grand Casino Biloxi
 Grand Sierra Resort
 Greektown Casino Hotel
 Hacienda (defunct)
 Hard Rock Hotel and Casino Atlantic City
 Hard Rock Hotel and Casino (Biloxi)
 Hard Rock Hotel and Casino (Las Vegas) (defunct)
 Hard Rock Hotel and Casino (Stateline)
 Harlow's Casino Resort
 Harrah's Atlantic City
 Harrah's Cherokee
 Harrah's Council Bluffs
 Harrah's Laughlin
 Harrah's Reno
 Harrah's Resort Southern California
 Harveys Lake Tahoe
 Hollywood Casino Bangor
 Hollywood Casino Bay St. Louis
 Hollywood Casino Hotel and Raceway
 Hoover Dam Lodge (formerly known as Gold Strike and Hacienda)
 Horseshoe Casino Tunica
 Horseshoe Las Vegas (formerly known as Bally's)
 Hotel Carrasco
 Hotel de Paris (Monte Carlo, Monaco)
 Hotel Nevada and Gambling Hall
 Ibiza Gran Hotel (Spain)
 IP Casino Resort & Spa
 Island View Casino
 Isle of Capri Boonville
 Isle of Capri Casinos
 Jackpot Junction
 Jackson Rancheria Casino Resort
 Jumer's Casino & Hotel
 Key Largo (defunct)
 Klondike Hotel and Casino (defunct)
 Landmark (defunct)
 Lasseters Hotel Casino
 Laughlin River Lodge (formerly known as Sam's Town Gold River, Gold River and River Palms)
 The Linq
 Little Six Casino
 The Londoner Macao
 Longstreet Hotel, Casino, and RV Resort
 Lucky Club Casino and Hotel
 Lucky Dragon Hotel and Casino (defunct)
 Lumière Place
 Luxor Las Vegas
 M Resort
 Main Street Station Hotel and Casino and Brewery
 Mandalay Bay
 Mapes Hotel (defunct)
 Marina Hotel and Casino
 Marina Bay Sands (Singapore)
 Mayagüez Resort & Casino
 Mesquite Star (defunct)
 MGM Grand Detroit
 MGM Grand Las Vegas
 MGM Resorts International
 Miccosukee Resort and Gaming
 The Mint Las Vegas (defunct)
 The Mirage
 Mohegan Sun
 MontBleu
 Morongo Casino, Resort & Spa
 MotorCity Casino Hotel
 Mystic Lake Casino Hotel
 Nevada Landing Hotel and Casino (defunct)
 New Frontier Hotel and Casino (defunct)
 New York-New York Hotel and Casino
 Nugget Casino Resort
 Oasis (defunct)
 Ocean Casino Resort
 Okada Manila
 The Orleans
 Ormsby House (closed)
 Oyo Hotel & Casino (formerly known as Hooters Casino Hotel)
 Pala Casino Resort and Spa
 Palace Bingo and Casino
 Palace Station
 The Palazzo
 Palms Casino Resort
 Par-A-Dice Hotel and Casino
 Paris Las Vegas
 The Parisian Macao
 Park Hyatt Mendoza (Argentina)
 Park MGM
 Pechanga Resort & Casino
 Penthouse Boardwalk Hotel and Casino
 Peppermill Reno
 Peppermill Wendover
 Planet Hollywood Resort & Casino
 Plaza Hotel & Casino
 Potawatomi Hotel & Casino
 Primm Valley Resort
 Railroad Pass Casino
 Red Garter Casino
 The Reef Hotel Casino
 Resorts Casino Hotel
 Resorts Casino Tunica
 Resorts World Bimini
 Resorts World Birmingham
 Resorts World Genting
 Resorts World Las Vegas
 Resorts World Manila
 Ocean Casino Resort (formerly Revel Atlantic City)
 Rio All Suite Hotel and Casino
 The Ritz-Carlton (San Juan, Puerto Rico)
 River Rock Casino Resort
 Riverside Hotel (Reno, Nevada) (defunct)
 Riverside Resort Hotel & Casino
 Riviera (defunct)
 Sahara Las Vegas
 Sahara Boardwalk Hotel and Casino
 San Juan Marriott Resort & Stellaris Casino
 Sands Atlantic City (defunct)
 Sands Macao
 Sands Hotel and Casino (defunct)
 Sands Regency
 Scarlet Pearl Casino
 Seminole Hard Rock Hotel and Casino Hollywood
 Seminole Hard Rock Hotel and Casino Tampa
 Seneca Niagara Casino & Hotel
 Seven Clans Casino Thief River Falls
 Seven Feathers Casino Resort
 Showboat Atlantic City (defunct)
 Siena Reno (presently just a stand-alone hotel)
 Silver Legacy Reno
 Silver Sevens (formerly known as Continental and Terrible's)
 Silverton Las Vegas (formerly known as Boomtown Las Vegas)
 Skyline Casino
 South Point Hotel, Casino & Spa
 Spirit Mountain Casino (Oregon)
 Stagecoach Hotel & Casino
 The Star Gold Coast
 The Star Sydney Casino & Hotel
 Stardust Resort and Casino (defunct)
 Stateline Casino (defunct)
 The Strat
 Studio City Macau
 Sun City Resort (South Africa)
 Sun International
 Suncoast Hotel and Casino
 Sunset Station
 Tachi Palace
 Texas Station (defunct)
 Thunder Valley Casino Resort
 Treasure Island Hotel and Casino
 Treasury Casino
 Tropicana Casino & Resort Atlantic City
 Tropicana Club
 Tropicana Express Hotel and Casino
 Tropicana Las Vegas
 Trump Plaza Hotel and Casino (defunct)
 Trump Taj Mahal (defunct)
 Trump World's Fair (defunct)
 Tunica Roadhouse Casino & Hotel
 Turtle Creek Casino and Hotel
 Tuscany Suites and Casino
 Vacation Village (defunct)
 The Ville Resort-Casino
 Virgin Hotels Las Vegas
 Vegas World (defunct)
 The Venetian Las Vegas
 The Venetian Macao
 Viejas Casino
 Waterfront Cebu City Hotel & Casino
 Wendover Nugget
 The Western (defunct)
 Westgate Las Vegas
 Westin Las Vegas
 Westward Ho Hotel and Casino (defunct)
 Wheeling Island Hotel-Casino-Racetrack
 Whiskey Pete's
 WinStar World Casino
 Wrest Point Hotel Casino
 Wynn Las Vegas
 Wynn Macau
 Wynn Palace

See also

 List of casinos
 List of casinos in the United States
 List of defunct gambling companies
 List of Las Vegas Strip hotels
 Demolished or closed Strip casinos and hotels
 Lists of hotels – an index of hotel list articles on Wikipedia
 List of tourist attractions worldwide

Notes

References
 

Hotels
Lists of hotels
Hotels